The men's 880 yard freestyle was a swimming event held as part of the Swimming at the 1904 Summer Olympics programme. The length of 880 yards (804.672 metres) was slightly longer than the 800 metres. It was the only time the event was held at the Olympics; the men's 800 metre freestyle event was introduced 116 years later, at the 2020 Summer Olympics.

6 swimmers from 5 nations competed.

Results

References

Sources
 

Swimming at the 1904 Summer Olympics